Wealdstone Football Club is an English semi-professional football club based in Ruislip, London Borough of Hillingdon, and affiliated to the Middlesex County Football Association. They currently play in the National League, the fifth tier of English football, having been promoted as champions of the National League South for the 2019-20 season. While established in 1899, it has roots dating to 1887 and was created through a series of local mergers in Wealdstone, then in Middlesex. For most of its existence the club was based at Lower Mead stadium in Harrow, until 1991. After a long period of homelessness and ground sharing with various local clubs, since 2008 they have been based at Grosvenor Vale. Their traditional colours are royal blue and white, and they are nicknamed "The Stones" or "The Royals".

The club were the first to achieve the famed non-league 'double', winning both the FA Trophy and the Alliance Premier League (now the National League) in the same season (1984–85). The latter happened two years before automatic promotions to the Football League began; Wealdstone has never been a member of the Football League so far. The club also have the distinction of appearing in the first ever football match to be televised in the UK, when the BBC showed part of their league match against rivals Barnet in October 1946.

History

Early years

The club was formed at the start of the 1899–1900 season, joining Division Two of the Willesden & District League. A previous "Wealdstone F.C." existed, for workers at a local gunsmith in Wealdstone, a Middlesex village to the north of Harrow Hill - itself has its origins in a club called The Oaks. An article published by the Harrow Observer states that the Wealdstone football club formed in about 1890, playing home games in a field in Hindes Road (present-day Harrow) and meeting at the Railway Hotel, close to Harrow and Wealdstone station. This club merged into another local club called Harrow Athletic F.C. in September 1894, while other clubs bearing the Wealdstone name soon formed. A merger between clubs called Wealdstone Rovers and Wealdstone Juniors resulted in the formation of Wealdstone Albion F.C. for the 1898 season, and using the same blue and white striped colours of the old Wealdstone F.C. A year later, Wealdstone F.C. took its place. At this time their home turf was a field between Headstone Drive and Marlborough Hill, Wealdstone.

Their first game was a friendly match on 7 October 1899 against Northwood, which they won 6–1. They were promoted to the league's Division One for the 1900–01 season after Division Two was scrapped. In 1903 they moved to the College Farm Ground in Locket Road, Wealdstone, and soon after another nearby ground in what is now Byron Park. In 1905–06 the club won Division One, but on 20 October 1906 a notice was posted in the local newspaper stating that the club was to be disbanded due to 'a lack of interest' from players and supporters.

The club was soon reformed in time for the 1908–09 season, rejoining Division One of the Willesden & District League. In 1910 they moved to Belmont Road, and won Division One again in 1912–13. Following World War I the club joined the London League and the Middlesex Senior League.

At the start of the 1922–23 season, Wealdstone F.C. switched to the Spartan League and at the same time moved south to a ground called Lower Mead in what is now central Harrow; this would become the permanent home ground of the club for 69 years. The club had their record win on 13 October 1923, beating the 12th London Regiment 22–0 in an FA Amateur Cup game.

Athenian League years (1928–1964)
In 1928–29 they switched leagues again, this time joining the Athenian League. In 1929–30 the club won the Middlesex Senior Cup and the Middlesex Senior Charity Cup for the first time.  On Saturday 16 November 1929, Wealdstone played Dulwich Hamlet in the FA Cup Fourth Qualifying Round, with the match ending in a record-breaking 7–7 draw; there has never been a 7–7 scoreline in any other FA Cup match before or since, and none either in the top four divisions of the League Pyramid (including play-offs), the League Cup, League Trophy, FA Community Shield, FA Trophy or FA Vase.  Four days later, Dulwich won the replay 2–1.

During World War II the club continued to play, playing at Wembley Stadium in the final of the Middlesex Senior Red Cross Cup in 1942. In December 1944, they recorded their heaviest defeat ever, losing 14–0 to Edgware Town in the London Senior Cup. In 1946 the BBC showed part of Wealdstone's Athenian League match at Barnet, the first time a live match had been televised. The club also appeared in the BBC's first two live FA Cup match broadcasts, with their games against Edgware Town in the third qualifying round and Colchester United in the fourth qualifying round being shown on television during the 1949–50 season. After beating Colchester, Wealdstone reached the first round of the FA Cup for the first time, losing 1–0 to Port Vale.

In 1951–52 the club won the Athenian League, and went on to win the Middlesex Senior Cup in 1959, 1963 and 1964.

Amateur Cup win and turning professional (1964–1979)  
In 1964 they switched to the Isthmian League. In 1965–66 the club reached the first round of the FA Cup again, losing 3–1 at Millwall, but went on to win the FA Amateur Cup, beating local rivals Hendon 3–1 in the final. The following season saw Wealdstone entered at the first round of the FA Cup, losing 2–0 at home to Nuneaton Borough.

The club joined the Division One North of the Southern League in 1971, turning professional. They were moved to Division One South the following season, and won the division in 1973–74, earning promotion to the Premier Division. In 1977–78 Wealdstone progressed beyond the first round of the FA Cup for the first time; after beating Third Division Hereford United 3–2 at Edgar Street in a first round replay, they went on to defeat Fourth Division Reading 2–1 at home in the second round, before losing 4–0 at First Division Queens Park Rangers in the third round.

Conference and non-league double (1979–1988) 
In 1979 the club were founder members of the Alliance Premier League, the new national top division of non-League football. After finishing 19th in 1980–81 they were relegated back to the Southern League, but then made an immediate return after winning the South Division of the Southern League the following season; a play-off ensued against Midland Division champions Nuneaton, with Wealdstone winning on penalties after winning the home leg 2–1 and losing 1–0 away. Wealdstone's return to the Alliance Premier League was much more positive than their first stint, finishing 3rd in 1982–83, and then 4th the following season.

In 1984–85 the club had its most successful season to date. Under the management of Brian Hall, Wealdstone won both the Alliance Premier League and also the FA Trophy, beating Boston United 2–1 in the final at Wembley Stadium. This was first ever occasion that the non-league "double" had been achieved by any team. However, in spite of this Wealdstone were not promoted to the English Football League. Automatic promotion from the Alliance Premier League would not be introduced until two years later, and Lower Mead was not deemed to meet Football League requirements so the club was not eligible to apply for election.

Following the double, a period of sharp decline soon set in; after finishing tenth the season after with an aging team, they finished 19th in 1986–87, and were eventually relegated at the end of the following season.

Decline and ground loss (1988–2004) 
By the end of the 1990–91 season, financial problems caused by boardroom impropriety were seriously exacerbated by the owner selling the club's Lower Mead ground for commercial development, for which the club, after protracted legal wrangling, received only a very small share of the proceeds. They then signed up to an expensive ground sharing arrangement at Watford's Vicarage Road, and at the end of the 1991–92 season the club were relegated again, dropping from the Southern League Premier Division into the Southern League South Division.

Seeking to reduce expenditure, in 1993 the club began a two-season ground sharing agreement at The Warren, Yeading's ground. In June 1995, with the club in administration and only having two players to its name, Gordon Bartlett was appointed manager. Later that year, Wealdstone re-joined the Isthmian League to further reduce their travelling expenses, having to agree to drop a level into Division Three in the process. Yet again, they moved grounds, this time entering into a ground share with Edgware Town at their White Lion ground that was to last ten years.

After winning the Isthmian League Division Three in 1996–97, they finished second in Division Two in 1997–98 and were promoted again, this time to Division One. However, after finishing third in Division One in the 1998–99, the Isthmian League denied the club promotion to the Premier Division because required improvements at the White Lion ground were not completed until six days after a specified deadline.

Home search and recovery (2004–2019) 

The club attempted to redevelop the local disused Prince Edward Playing Fields at Canons Park, owned by the London Borough of Harrow, into a new home ground. Construction of the new stadium started in 2003 but, when over 30% completed, building work was suddenly halted in April 2004 when the private company who were co-financing the project in partnership with the club went into insolvency. Unable to afford to complete the new stadium on their own, Wealdstone were forced to leave the site unfinished for two years, until Harrow Council, frustrated that the site was still unused and falling into disrepair, eventually sold the site lease to Barnet F.C., who used it as a training centre before later moving permanently in to what became The Hive Stadium in 2013.

In 2004 Wealdstone were promoted to the Isthmian League Premier Division as a result of the creation of the Conference North and South. The club faced Dulwich Hamlet in the playoff final, with the game finishing 2-2 before Wealdstone won 5-4 on penalties. The club's first two seasons at Premier Division level saw them steer clear of relegation, with back to back 18th placed finishes. Off the pitch, the club began a further new groundshare arrangement in 2005, this time moving to Northwood's Chestnut Avenue ground. In 2006 they were switched under FA reorganisation to the Southern League Premier Division for a single season, before returning to the Isthmian League the following season.

In January 2008, Wealdstone acquired Ruislip Sports and Social club and the associated lease at Ruislip Manor's Grosvenor Vale ground, starting the 2008-09 season there. With the ground share agreement at Northwood coming to an end and still no specific completion date in sight for the club's Prince Edward Playing Field project, Wealdstone instead decided to invest in the Grosvenor Vale stadium to upgrade the playing facilities as a priority, in order to meet the necessary ground grading requirements to play Isthmian League Premier Division football in the 2008–09 season. The club's first 3 seasons at the Vale saw the club fail to reach the playoffs, finishing 7th, 6th and then 12th. They did however reach the first round of the FA Cup in 2009-10, where they lost 3-2 at home to Rotherham United

2011–12 saw Wealdstone embark on a run the FA Trophy which saw them reach the semi-final and knock out three teams from higher divisions. A 2-1 win at home to Conference side Barrow and a 1-0 win in a replay against Dartford of the Conference South set up a quarter-final away at Cambridge United which Wealdstone won 2-1 thanks to a Richard Jolly brace, before eventually losing 3–1 on aggregate to Newport County in the semi-final. They also reached the promotion play-offs in the Isthmian Premier Division that year, but lost 2–1 to Lowestoft Town in the semi-finals. The following season saw them losing in the play-off semi finals again, this time losing 2-1 against Concord Rangers. However, in 2013–14 did win promotion as league champions, with their promotion to the Conference South being secured with a 1-0 win away to Margate.

Wealdstone did not win any of their first 9 games in the Conference South, with the run ended by a 1-0 victory away to Whitehawk. An upturn in form meant that they finished the 2014-15 season in 12th place, and they would go on to finish 13th the following season. The summer of 2016 saw the club change ownership when Peter Marsden, previously chairman of Accrington Stanley, took over the club in late July. The 2016-17 season saw Wealdstone experience a greater degree of success on the pitch, with the club pushing for the playoffs. However, their hopes were dashed when it was announced that they would be ineligible to compete in the playoffs due to missing the cut off point to meet ground grading requirements. Wealdstone's eventual 8th placed finish would not have seen them compete regardless.

On 21 August 2017, Gordon Bartlett stepped down as Wealdstone manager after 22 years. A day later, Bobby Wilkinson, formerly of Hungerford Town, was appointed manager. Wilkinson's first season at Wealdstone ended an unremarkable 11th-placed finish in the league, although the club reached the semi final of the FA Trophy, where they lost 3–0 on aggregate to eventual winners Brackley. In January 2019, chairman Peter Marsden was voted out of his position, and replaced by Rory Fitzgerald. On the final day of the 2018–19 season, Wealdstone rose from 10th to 7th on with a 2–1 win over Hemel Hempstead to ensure a place in the playoffs. Wealdstone began their playoff campaign with a win away at Bath to secure a semi final against Woking, which Wealdstone narrowly lost 3–2. Wilkinson subsequently left the club at the end of the season.

Title win and the National League (2019–present) 
On 21 May 2019 Dean Brennan was appointed as new manager, with Stuart Maynard joining as his assistant. 10 wins in the first 11 games of the 2019–20 season saw Wealdstone rise to the top of the league. On 26 March 2020 the season was suspended due to the global COVID-19 pandemic, with Wealdstone still top of the league. On 17 June it was confirmed that the club were to be promoted to the National League as champions of the National League South, on the basis of points won per game.

The club's first season in the fifth tier for 32 years started positively, with 5 wins in the first 8 seeing the club rise to 2nd in the league. However, following a slump in form, Brennan departed his role as manager on 2 February 2021. The club subsequently appointed assistant manager Stuart Maynard as manager, with Matthew Saunders as his assistant. On 5 April, Wealdstone defeated local rivals Barnet 5–1. The club ended their first season back at National League level in 19th place.

In their second season in the National League, Wealdstone recorded a 16th placed finish, their highest league position for 35 years. The season also saw a new attendance record set at Grosvenor Vale, when Wealdstone defeated Barnet 1-0 in front of a crowd of 2,662. The following campaign saw them host 2,817 in a 0-0 draw with Wrexham.

Club crest
The club's crest first appeared on team shirts in the 1960s. It contains four quarters representing the traditional colours of the club (royal blue and white); the "Three Lions" representing England; a football representing the club's sport; and the emblem of Middlesex, the historic county of the London Borough of Harrow where the club is from.

Rivalry
Wealdstone's main rivals are often considered to be Barnet. The clubs were both founding members of the Alliance Premier League and played each other regularly throughout the 1980s, although games were rarely played after that with the clubs being in different divisions. The rivalry came back to prominence when Barnet moved into The Hive Stadium which was initially meant for Wealdstone. The two clubs do now play in the same division. Other rivals have included Harrow Borough (with whom the "Harrow Derby" is contested), Enfield, and Hendon, with Wealdstone beating the latter in the 1966 Amateur Cup final.

Players

Current squad

Out on loan

Notable former players
For all Wealdstone F.C. players with a Wikipedia article, see 

The club's all-time leading goalscorer is George Duck. Duck scored 251 goals for Wealdstone in 370 appearances between 1972 and 1979, and additionally set unmatched scoring records for penalties and hat-tricks. In every season he played for the club Duck was top scorer in league and cup competitions.

Amongst former players who have gone on to notable careers at the highest level of professional football are Stuart Pearce, Vinnie Jones and Jermaine Beckford. Harold Smith was the first ever player to leave Wealdstone FC for a professional career, joining Notts County in 1930.

Non-playing staff
As of 26 May 2022

Management
As of 29 March 2021

Managerial history

 Pre 1961 Team selection committee
 
 June 1961 – April 1968 Vince Burgess
 
 May 1968 – December 1969 Dave Underwood
 
 December 1969 – June 1970 Howard Moxon
 
 June 1970 – March 1972 Alan Humphries
 
 March 1972 – March 1974 Syd Prosser
 
 March 1974 – March 1976 Eddie Presland
 
 April 1976 – February 1977 Geoff Coleman
 
 February 1977 – September 1979 Alan Fogarty
 
 September 1979 – November 1980 Ken Payne
 
 November 1980 – August 1983 Allen Batsford
 
 August 1983 – January 1987 Brian Hall
 
 February 1987 – September 1987 Colin Meldrum
 
 September 1987 – November 1987 Terry Burton
 
 December 1987 – October 1989 Tony Jennings
 
 October 1989 – December 1990 Alan Gane
 
 December 1990 – September 1992 Brian Hall
 
 September 1992 – September 1993 Dennis Byatt
 
 September 1993 – June 1995 Fred Callaghan
 
 July 1995 – August 2017 Gordon Bartlett 
 
 August 2017 – May 2019 Bobby Wilkinson
 
 May 2019 – February 2021 Dean Brennan
 
 March 2021- Stuart Maynard

Records
Best FA Cup performance: Third round, 1977–78
Best FA Trophy performance: Winners, 1984–85
Best FA Vase performance: Third round, 1997–98
Best FA Amateur Cup performance: Winners, 1965–66
Record attendance: 13,504 vs Leytonstone, FA Amateur Cup fourth round replay, 5 March 1949
Biggest victory: 22–0 vs 12th London Regiment, FA Amateur Cup, 13 October 1923
Heaviest defeat: 0–14 vs Edgware Town, London Senior Cup, 9 December 1944
Most appearances: Charlie Townsend, 514
Most goals: George Duck, 251

Honours

League 
Alliance Premier League (Tier 5)
Champions (1): 1984–85
National League South (Tier 6)
Champions (1): 2019–20
Isthmian League Premier (Tier 7)
Champions (1): 2013–14
Isthmian League Division 3 
Champions (1):  1996–97
Southern League Division One South 
Champions (1): 1973–74
Southern League South Division 
Champions (1): 1981–82
Athenian League
Champions (1): 1951–52
Willesden & District League Division One 
Champions (2): 1905–06, 1912–13

Cups 
FA Trophy
Winners (1): 1984–85
Southern League League Cup 
Winners (1): 1981–82
Southern League Championship Shield 
Winners (1): 1981–82
Southern League Championship Cup 
Winners (1): 1981–82
FA Amateur Cup
Winners (1): 1965–66
Middlesex Premier Cup
Winners (4): 2003–04, 2007–08, 2008–09, 2010–11
London Senior Cup
Winners (1): 1951–52 (shared with Wimbledon)
Middlesex Senior Cup
Winners (11): 1929–30, 1937–38, 1940–41, 1941–42, 1942–43, 1945–46, 1958–59, 1962–63, 1963–64, 1967–68, 1984–85
Middlesex Charity Cup
Winners (9): 1929–30, 1930–31, 1937–38, 1938–39, 1949–50, 1963–64, 1967–68, 2003–04, 2010–11
Middlesex Junior Cup
Winners (2): 1912–13
Suburban League North Division 
Champions (1): 1990–91

See also
The Wealdstone Raider

References

External links

Association football clubs established in 1899
Football clubs in England
Football clubs in London
Southern Football League clubs
Sport in the London Borough of Harrow
Isthmian League
Athenian League
1899 establishments in England
National League (English football) clubs
Wealdstone F.C.